The Mad Bomberg (German:Der tolle Bomberg) may refer to:

 The Mad Bomberg (novel), a 1923 novel by Josef Winckler
 The Mad Bomberg (1932 film), a 1932 German film adaptation
 The Mad Bomberg (1957 film), a 1957 West German film adaptation